Steve Boeddeker is a sound editor. Boeddeker and fellow sound editor Richard Hymns were nominated for an Academy Award for Best Sound Editing for the film All Is Lost (2013).

Filmography
Monkeybone (2001) Sound Designer
Frequency  (2000) Sound Designer
Hellboy (2004) Sound Designer, Interviewed on "Making of"
Hart's War (2002) Sound Designer/Re-Recording Sound Mixer (as Stephen Boedekker)
Drive Angry (2011) Sound Designer (as Steve "Falcon" Boedekker)
Charlie and the Chocolate Factory (2005) Sound Designer
Star Wars: The Clone Wars (2011–12) Sound Editor (Seasons 4 & 5), Re-Recording Mixer (Season 4, Episodes 15-17)
Contact (1997) Sound Effects Editor
Zambezia (2012) Sound Effects Editor
Hemingway & Gellhorn (2012) Sound Effects Editor (Emmy Award for Best Sound Editing: Miniseries)
Naqoyqatsi (2002) Sound Designer (as Steven Boeddeker)/Re-Recording Mixer? (according to skysound.com)
Se7en (1995) Assistant SFX Editor/Assistant Sound Designer?/Writer & Performer of "Lust"
All Is Lost (2013) Supervising Sound Editor, Sound Designer & Re-Recording Mixer (Academy Award Nomination for Best Sound Editing)
Starship Troopers 2: Hero of the Federation (2004) Sound Design and Supervising Sound Editor/Re-Recording Mixer
Mars Attacks! (1996) Assistant Sound Designer
The Village (2004) Supervising Sound Editor & Sound Design
Infiniti-M ads (2005) Sound Designer (Directed by Chiat Day)
Paranorman (2012) Sound Designer
The Avengers (2012) Sound Effects Editor/Uncredited Foley Editor? (according to IMDb)
Be Home Soon: Letters from my Grandfather (2012) Sound Design (according to official site)/Uncredited Sound Editor? (according to IMDb)
Chain Reaction (1996) Assistant Sound Designer
The Game (1997) Conforming Editor
The Frighteners (1996) Sound Effects Editor
Lincoln (2012) Additional Re-Recording Mixer
Now You See Me (2013) Sound Designer/Re-Recording Mixer
Maleficent (2014) Sound Designer until replaced by Tim Nielsen
The Company You Keep Sound Designer/Re-Recording Mixer
Alice In Wonderland Sound Designer/Supervising Sound Editor
Fight Club (1999) Sound Effects Editor
Beasts of the Southern Wild (2012) Sound Designer/Sound Effects Editor/Re-Recording Mixer
Hand of God (2014) Sound Designer
Lara Croft: Tomb Raider (2001) Sound Designer/Supervising Sound Editor
Lara Croft Tomb Raider: The Cradle of Life (2003) Sound Designer & Supervising Sound Editor
Rules of Engagement (1999) Sound Designer/Supervising Sound Editor
The Hunted (2003) Sound Designer
Ratchet & Clank: All 4 One (2011) Sound Designer
Skylanders: Spyro's Adventure (2011) Sound Designer
Toy Story that Time Forgot (2014) Sound Designer
Jinn (2014) Sound Designer/Re-Recording Mixer
Silent (2014) Sound Designer/Sound Editor
The Touch (2002) Sound Designer/Re-Recording Mixer
X-Men (2000) Sound Designer
The Horse Whisperer (1998) Sound Designer
Mimic (1997) Sound Design
Armageddon (1998) Sound Editor
The Faculty (1998) Sound Designer
Halloween H20: 20 Years Later (1998) Sound Designer
Lake Placid (1999) Sound Designer
Dracula 2000 (2000) Sound Designer/Music Composer/Writer & Performer of "Bridge The Gap"
The Exorcist (1977, 1998 re-release) Sound Designer/Music Composer
The Eye (2008) Additional Sound Design
Project Arbiter (2014) Sound Supervisor/Rerecording Mixer (according to official site)
Sweeney Todd: The Demon Barber of Fleet Street (2007) Sound Designer
Daredevil (2003) Sound Designer, Special Thanks on "Making of"
Bug (2006) Sound Designer
Maanokoobiyo (2013) Sound Designer
American Express ad with M. Night Shyamalan (2006) - Sound Designer
The Corpse Bride (2005) Sound Designer
Tron Legacy (2010) Sound Designer
Killer Joe (2011) Sound Designer/Writer of "Led Pud"
Coraline (2009) Sound Effects Editor (uncredited)
Lady in the Water (2006) Sound Designer
LUV (2011) Sound Designer
My Bloody Valentine (2009) Sound Designer
The Kite Runner (2007) Sound Designer
I Origins (2014) Sound Designer/Supervising Sound Editor/Re-Recording Mixer
Journey of Hanuman (2013) Sound Effects Editor
From Hell (2001) Sound Designer (as Steven Boedecker)
The 13th Warrior (1999) Sound Effects Editor (as Steve Boedecker)
54 (1998) Sound Designer
Dogma (1999) Additional Music/The Producers would like to thank
The Prophecy 3: The Ascent (2000) Music Composer
MythBusters Interviewed on "How To Blow Your Own Sail" about making a good punch sound

References

External links
 

American sound editors
Living people
Year of birth missing (living people)
Place of birth missing (living people)
Emmy Award winners